The UK Infrastructure Bank is a British state-owned development bank. It is intended to help with the UK Government's plan to reach net-zero carbon by 2050 and to support economic growth in regional and local sectors across the United Kingdom. Then Chancellor of the Exchequer, Rishi Sunak, stated that the bank would be tasked to invest in sectors such as "renewable energy, carbon capture, storage and transportation", and would provide "low-rate loans to mayors and councils to fund projects". The bank is publicly owned with its sole shareholder being the Treasury Solicitor in the capacity of HM Treasury. The bank was given initial capital amounting to £12bn, is able to offer up to £10bn of government guarantees, with its final capacity being £22bn.

History 
The UK Infrastructure Bank was announced in the government policy paper, "National Infrastructure Strategy: fairer, faster, greener", on 25 November 2020. Its founding document was published by HM Treasury on 17 June 2021.

Operation 
The firm's core objective is, with cooperation of private and public sector entities, "to increase infrastructure investment to help to tackle climate change and promote economic growth across the regions and nations of the United Kingdom." The firm seeks to pursue this goal with two objectives:

 "To help tackle climate change, particularly meeting the government’s net zero emissions target by 2050."
 "To support regional and local economic growth through better connectedness, opportunities for new jobs and higher levels of productivity."

Six priorities were established for the operation of the firm to meet the two above objectives:

 To achieve policy objective and generate a positive financial return over time, to tackle climate change, support economic growth, and reduce the burden on the taxpayer
 To operate in partnership with private and public sector entities together
 To prioritise investments which lack a significant amount of private sector financing
 To operate independently of the shareholder while meeting conditions imposed thereby
 To exist as a long-lasting institution and provide long-term capital through its investments
 To have the flexibility to respond to differing market conditions in order to deliver on its mandate

Activities 
The bank's total capital is £22bn, consisting of:

£5bn of equity from the Treasury, of which £1.5bn can be drawn down a year for the first 5 years
 £7bn of debt which can be borrowed from the Debt Management Office or private markets with an annual borrowing limit of £1.5 billion subject to an overall borrowing limit of £7 billion
 £10bn of guarantees (with the UK Infrastructure Bank taking over the management of the UK Guarantee Scheme), with up to £2.5 billion in guarantees being able to be issued in any year, subject to an overall limit of £10 billion.

Portfolio

References 

Government-owned companies of the United Kingdom